Symbiopsis is a Neotropical genus of butterflies in the family Lycaenidae.

Species
Symbiopsis aprica (Möschler, 1883)
Symbiopsis lenitas (Druce, 1907)
Symbiopsis morpho Nicolay, 1971
Symbiopsis nivepunctata (Druce, 1907)
Symbiopsis panamensis (Draudt, 1920)
Symbiopsis pencilatus Johnson & Le Crom, 1997
Symbiopsis pentas Nicolay, 1971
Symbiopsis perulera Robbins, 2004
Symbiopsis pupilla (Draudt, 1920)
Symbiopsis rickmani (Schaus, 1902)
Symbiopsis strenua (Hewitson, 1877)
Symbiopsis tanais (Godman & Salvin, [1887])

References

External links
Images representing Symbiopsis at Butterflies of the Americas

Eumaeini
Lycaenidae of South America
Lycaenidae genera